Zora Ulla Keslerová (born 11 August 1950) is a Czech actress, dancer, singer and model. Often credited under the names Zora Kerova, Zora Kerowa or Zora Keer, she became known for starring in numerous Italian horror films during the 1980s.

Born in Prague, Czechoslovakia, she began her career as a dancer and singer, later becoming a photo model. Kerova made her screen debut in the Italian film, La febbre americana (1978). A year later, she appeared in the Czech drama, Křehké vztahy, and another Italian film, Terror Express. She followed by starring in cult horror films such as Antropophagus (1980), Cannibal Ferox (1981) and Lucio Fulci's The New York Ripper (1982). She later appeared in another two Fulci's films, Touch of Death (1988) and Sodoma's Ghost (1988).

Early life
Zora Kerova was born in Prague, Czechoslovakia.

Career
She began her career as a cultural dancer and singer, and later became a model.  Her career expanded and she decided to become an actress.  She began her acting career in Italian cinema. In 1978, she made her acting debut in La Febbre Americana, with co-star Italian actor and writer George Eastman (actor), whom she also worked with in later films.  In 1979, Zora starred in the Czech film Krehké Vztahy (The Fragile Relations), a psychological drama, in which she played a divorced mother.  The film was not a success at the time.  A string of minor film roles followed.

Italian cinema offered more for her career; she became a star in Italy under several names including Zora Kerowa and Zora Keer.  She appeared in many erotic, action, and of course horror films throughout the eighties.

Apart from her roles in erotic films, Zora is remembered for starring in several cult horror classics. In 1980, she played psychic "Carol" in Antropophagus, in which she and a group of people head to an island, Carol feels there is something evil on it, and the group is one by one murdered by a madman played by George Eastman. Zora said in interviews she mainly remembers being very seasick in the boating scenes. In a 2005 interview alongside Eastman, Kerova explained that she never really got to know director Joe D'Amato on the set of the film, and that she learned phonetic English by listening to The Beatles. 

In 1981, she starred as "Pat Johnson" in Cannibal Ferox, in which she was seen hanging on hooks by her breasts.  In 1982, she played "Eva" in The New York Ripper, in which her character gets a smashed liquor bottle into her groin by the insane killer.

Then, Zora again worked with George Eastman in The New Barbarians (also known as Warriors of the Wasteland).

Throughout her acting career she has worked with such directors as Joe D'Amato, Umberto Lenzi, Lucio Fulci, and Ferdinando Baldi.  Fulci was her favorite director, and in interviews she dispelled the rumor that he was a misogynist.

Her final cinematic film Papà dice messa came out in 1996, but Kerova returned to acting in 2006 starring in the direct-to-video film La Radice del Male (The Root of Evil) directed by Silvana Zancolò.

Filmography

References

External links
 
 

1950 births
Living people
Actresses from Prague
Czech film actresses
Czechoslovak emigrants to Italy
Italian film actresses